Luboš Brchel (7 March 1920 – 31 October 1981) was a Slovak alpine skier. He competed in three events at the 1948 Winter Olympics.

References

1920 births
1981 deaths
Slovak male alpine skiers
Olympic alpine skiers of Czechoslovakia
Alpine skiers at the 1948 Winter Olympics
Sportspeople from Kladno